Tuffeau stone — in French, simply tuffeau or tufeau — is a local limestone of the Loire Valley of France. It is characterized as a chalky or sandy, fine-grained limestone, white to yellowish-cream in appearance, and micaceous (containing some white flakes of mica, or muscovite).  The soft stone is extracted from numerous quarries and has made a major mark on the architectural landscape of the Loire and its tributaries — especially the valley's world-famous chateaux.

Geology
Tuffeau dates to the Mesozoic era (Upper Cretaceous Turonian stage). The Loire Valley formed the floor of a vast sea 90 million years ago. Over the millennia, sediment from the sea floor, comprising fossilized living organisms and sand particles, became compressed to form what is now known as Tuffeau stone. It differs from genuine chalk by the presence of foraminifera and many remains of shells originally deposited in shallow water (between 2 and 20 meters) and subsequently agitated, near a coastline. In contrast, true chalk is rich in another type of shelly micro-fossil, the coccolith, which was deposited in deeper (~ 200 meters), and quieter, water.

The term tuffeau is etymologically related to another stone, tuff, to which is it not geologically related — and to tufa, to which it is geologically related. These words derive from Italian tufo and from Latin tōphus or tōfus ("stone").

Physical properties
Tuffeau has a very low density compared with many other rocks, being half as dense as granite, comparable in density with ebony, and only about 10 to 20% heavier than water. It has porosity of up to 50%, whereas that of granite is only about 1%. The compressive strength of the stone is a factor of 10 to 20 times less than that of granite.

When mixed with local sand and flinty clays from later eras, tuffeau is said to create the best vineyards soils.

Mining

Tuffeau mining reached its peak in the 15th century. As a construction material — especially in the Touraine and Anjou regions — tuffeau has been extracted mostly from natural riverside bluffs, which are extensive. The extracted blocks could thus be loaded onto boats. Over the centuries, this has created extensive underground  galleries, or mines, some of which are several kilometers in extent. These artificial caves have long been used as human dwellings, as the indoor temperature is remarkably constant from summer to winter. The greatest concentration of these cave dwellers — les troglodytes — is in the region of Saumur.

 

The mines are a perfect environment for wine cellars. Many of the larger caves have become champignonnieres — i.e., are used for growing a commercial variety of mushroom, which is transported daily to the markets of Paris.

Architecture

Numerous buildings in the Loire Valley, from the most modest to the most grandiose, were built from blocks of tuffeau stone, including the Château de Beaulieu near Saumur, the Château d'Ussé and the Château de la Motte d'Usseau, and many worker's cottages at Longères.

See also
List of types of limestone

Building stone
Limestone
Geography of France
Underground mines in France